This article describes the Japan Meteorological Agency (JMA) severe weather terminology. This article describes JMA terminology and related JMA weather scales. Some terms may be specific to certain regions.

Warning Categories 
Severe weather bulletins are issued as an advisory or a warning, depending on the risk or severity of the event. Less severe events that could be a cause for concern will be issued as a bulletin or an advisory.

: provide information to supplement warnings and advisories.

Meteorological Warnings 
Weather advisories and warnings are issued when potentially hazardous weather is occurring or is forecast for the short-term period.

General Warnings 
Due to its local-scale nature, an advisory is typically issued in advance for public forecast areas where conditions may be favorable for the development of severe weather. A warning is issued for areas where severe weather is imminent or occurring.

Advisories

Warnings

Marine Warnings

Typhoons or Tropical Depressions

Flood Forecasting

Seismological Warnings

Earthquake Information

Earthquake Early Warning

Tsunami Warnings

Volcano Information

See also 
 List of severe weather phenomena
 Japan Meteorological Agency
 Severe weather terminology (United States)
 Severe weather terminology (Canada)

External links 
 Forecast Services by Japan Meteorological Agency
 Meteorological terminology by Japan Meteorological Agency

Notes and references 

Japan Meteorological Agency
Severe weather and convection
Weather warnings and advisories